The 1988 BC Lions finished in third place in the West Division with a 10–8 record. They appeared in the 76th Grey Cup as the team favoured to win, but they lost to the Winnipeg Blue Bombers 22–21.

Offseason

CFL Draft

Preseason

Regular season

Season standings

Season schedule

Awards and records
CFL's Most Outstanding Player Award – David Williams (WR)
Jeff Nicklin Memorial Trophy  – David Williams (WR)

1988 CFL All-Stars
QB – Matt Dunigan, CFL All-Star
RB – Anthony Cherry, CFL All-Star
WR – David Williams, CFL All-Star
OG – Gerald Roper, CFL All-Star
OT – Jim Mills, CFL All-Star
LB – Greg Stumon, CFL All-Star

Playoffs

West Semi-Final

West Final

Grey Cup

References

BC Lions seasons
N. J. Taylor Trophy championship seasons
1988 Canadian Football League season by team
1988 in British Columbia